Pedro Étienne Solère (4 April 1753 – 1817) was a French composer, teacher of music and clarinetist.

Biography 
Born in Mont-Louis, Solère began playing clarinet as a child. He was very talented and already at the age of 14, he joined the Champagne infantry regiment orchestra. To complete his professional skills, he studied in Paris with Michel Yost. In 1784, he performed at the Concert Spirituel. He was noticed by the Duke Louis Philippe I, Duke of Orléans, who hired him.

He toured in Italy, Spain and Russia, and gained international renown. After the Duke's death, Solère became first clarinet in the French King's orchestra. Thanks to his reputation, he was recruited as a professor at the Conservatoire de Paris, founded in 1795. His friendship with François Devienne greatly influenced his creative work.

His compositions are mainly known today for his works for clarinet.

Compositions

Works for orchestra 
 Concerto in E flat major, for clarinet and orchestra
 Concerto in E flat major, for two clarinets and orchestra
 Spanish Concerto in B flat major, for clarinet and orchestra
 Concert Symphonies No. 1 and 2, for two clarinets and orchestra

Chamber music 
 2 Duos for two clarinets
 3 Fantasies for clarinet and piano

External links 
 Pedro Étienne Solère (Musicalics)
 Pedro Étienne Solère (AllMusic)
 Pedro Étienne Solère - Concerto Espagnol in B-flat major for clarinet (c.1800) (YouTube)
 

1753 births
1817 deaths
Musicians from Paris
French classical composers
French male classical composers
French classical clarinetists
18th-century French musicians
19th-century French musicians
Academic staff of the Conservatoire de Paris
19th-century French male musicians